The 2010 BNP Paribas Masters was a tennis tournament played on indoor hard courts. It was the 38th edition of the tournament known that year as the BNP Paribas Masters after the sponsor BNP Paribas. It was part of the ATP World Tour Masters 1000 of the 2010 ATP World Tour. It was held at the Palais omnisports de Paris-Bercy in Paris, France, from 6 November through 14 November 2010. The top eight seeds were Roger Federer, defending champion Novak Djokovic, Andy Murray, Robin Söderling, Tomáš Berdych, Fernando Verdasco, David Ferrer and Andy Roddick.

Robin Söderling defeated Gaël Monfils 6–1, 7–6(7–1) in the final to win his first Masters 1000 championship and rise to a career-high world ranking of No. 4. Monfils was playing in his second successive Paris Masters final having saved five match points in defeating Roger Federer in the semifinals.

Finals

Singles

 Robin Söderling' defeated  Gaël Monfils 6–1, 7–6(7–1)
It was Söderling's second title of the year and 6th of his career. It was his first Masters title.

Doubles

 Mahesh Bhupathi /  Max Mirnyi defeated  Mark Knowles /  Andy Ram 7–5, 7–5

Entrants

Seeds

 Seeds are based on the rankings of November 1, 2010.

Other entrants
The following players received wildcards into the singles main draw:
  Arnaud Clément
  Nicolas Mahut
  Florent Serra

The following player received a special exempt into the singles main draw:
  Marcel Granollers

The following players received entry from the qualifying draw:
  Benjamin Becker
  Fabio Fognini
  Santiago Giraldo
  Illya Marchenko
  Jarkko Nieminen
  Josselin Ouanna

The following players received entry as a Lucky loser into the singles main draw:
  Michael Russell

Notable withdrawals
  Rafael Nadal (shoulder injury)
  Jo-Wilfried Tsonga (knee injury)
  Marcos Baghdatis (shoulder injury)
  Juan Carlos Ferrero (knee & wrist surgery)
  Mardy Fish (ankle injury)

References

External links
 Official website
 ATP tournament profile
 ITF – Paris Open Tournament Details